Conrad Schmidt (February 27, 1830 – December 26, 1908) was a Union Army soldier during the American Civil War. He received the Medal of Honor for gallantry during the Battle of Opequon more commonly called the Third Battle of Winchester, Virginia on September 19, 1864.

Schmidt joined the army from Fort Leavenworth in February 1861, and was discharged in December 1866.

Medal of Honor citation
“The President of the United States of America, in the name of Congress, takes pleasure in presenting the Medal of Honor to First Sergeant Conrad Schmidt, United States Army, for extraordinary heroism on 19 September 1864, while serving with Company K, 2d U.S. Cavalry, in action at Winchester, Virginia. First Sergeant Schmidt went to the assistance of his regimental commander, whose horse had been killed under him in a charge, mounted the officer behind him, under a heavy fire from the enemy, and returned him to his command.”

See also

List of Medal of Honor recipients
List of American Civil War Medal of Honor recipients: Q–S

References

External links
Military Hall of Valor
Findagrave entry

1830 births
1908 deaths
Württemberger emigrants to the United States
Union Army soldiers
People of Kansas in the American Civil War
United States Army Medal of Honor recipients
German-born Medal of Honor recipients
American Civil War recipients of the Medal of Honor